The cinnamon-bellied ground tyrant (Muscisaxicola capistratus) is a species of bird in the family Tyrannidae, the tyrant flycatchers.

It is found in western Argentina, eastern Andean Chile, southwest Bolivia, and southern Peru.
Its natural habitat is temperate grassland.

The cinnamon-bellied ground tyrant breeds in extreme southern Argentina and Chile, and northern Tierra del Fuego, and migrates north in the austral winter.

References

External links
"Cinnamon-bellied ground tyrant" photo gallery VIREO

cinnamon-bellied ground tyrant
Birds of Patagonia
Birds of Tierra del Fuego
cinnamon-bellied ground tyrant
Taxonomy articles created by Polbot